Megha Mittal (born 20 November 1976 in Kolkata, India) is a fashion entrepreneur. She is the former Chairperson and Managing Director of the German fashion luxury brand Escada. 

She is a member on the Board of Advisors of the Wharton School since June 2020.  She and her husband, Aditya Mittal, actively donate to philanthropic causes related to child health both in India and the UK.

Education and career
Megha is the daughter of Mahendra Kumar Patodia of Hyderabad She completed her schooling from Hyderabad Public School. 

Mittal graduated from the Wharton School of Business in 1997, with a B.S. in Economics with concentration in Finance. She subsequently joined the Investment Bank Goldman Sachs as an Analyst in the Research Department. In 2003, she obtained a Postgraduate Degree in Architectural Interior Design at the Inchbald School of Design in London. Mittal left Goldman Sachs after one year.

In November 2009, she acquired Escada.

References 

Businesswomen from Rajasthan
Wharton School of the University of Pennsylvania alumni
Living people
1976 births
Indian expatriates in the United Kingdom
Indian businesspeople in fashion
Goldman Sachs people
Megha